The Second Round may refer to: 
 The second round of voting which takes place in a two-round voting system.
 The Second Round (album) an album by Taiwanese pop group Mayday (Taiwanese band) 
 The Second Round (novel) a novel by Gambian writer Lenrie Peters